Microbacterium invictum is a Gram-positive and facultatively aerobic bacterium from the genus Microbacterium which has been isolated from compost in Portugal.

References

External links
Type strain of Microbacterium invictum at BacDive -  the Bacterial Diversity Metadatabase	

Bacteria described in 2009
invictum